WS4 can refer to:

 Waardenburg syndrome type IV
 WS4, a candidate phylum of bacteria